This is a list of mayors of Nuremberg (Oberbürgermeister der Stadt Nürnberg) since 1818:

 1818–1821: Christian Gottfried Lorsch
 1821–1853: Jakob Friedrich Binder
 1854–1867: Maximilian von Waechter
 1867–1891: Otto Freiherr von Stromer
 1892–1913: Georg Ritter von Schuh (FVP)
 1913–1919: Otto Geßler (FVP)
 1920–1933: Hermann Luppe (DDP)
 1933–1945: Willy Liebel (NSDAP)
 1945: Julius Rühm (NSDAP)
 1945: Martin Treu (SPD)
 1945–1948: Hans Ziegler (SPD)
 1948–1951: Otto Ziebill (SPD)
 1952–1957: Otto Bärnreuther (SPD)
 1957–1987: Andreas Urschlechter (SPD)
 1987–1996: Peter Schönlein (SPD)
 1996–2002: Ludwig Scholz (CSU)
 2002–2020: Ulrich Maly (SPD)
 since 2020: Marcus König (CSU)

See also
 Timeline of Nuremberg

Nuremberg
Mayors